The Piazza Duca d'Aosta is a large and busy square in Milan, Italy, where Milan's Central Station, the Pirelli Tower and the city's business district is located. It is well known for containing the architecturally impressive and majestic Milan Central Station, several skyscrapers (including the Pirelli Tower) and exclusive hotels, such as the Excelsior Hotel Gallia.

External links

 360° view of Piazza Duca d'Aosta

Piazzas in Milan